Seacrest Cove 2 also known as Alki Cove 2 is a local dive site in West Seattle, Washington. The site within Seacrest Park is the most popular diving location in Seattle.

Cove 2 is often used as a training site for open water, navigation and other scuba classes. Because of the easily reached deep areas, technical divers also use Cove 2 for training. The site has a silty bottom, but many submerged logs, pilings and sunken boats (the Honey Bear) that are well decorated with Pacific Northwest marine life. There are restrooms in the pier building. The site has a view of the Seattle skyline across Elliott Bay. There is an exclusion zone of 150 feet around the walk-on ferry dock. Other sites (Coves 1 and 3) are just to the north and south respectively. Most parking is curbside on the street.

References

Underwater diving sites in the United States
Landforms of Seattle
Bays of Washington (state)
Coves of the United States
Bodies of water of King County, Washington
Bays of King County, Washington